Robijn F. Bruinsma (born May 15, 1953, Haarlem, The Netherlands) is a theoretical physicist and is Professor of Physics at the University of California, Los Angeles and Chair of the Department of Theoretical Physics for the Life Sciences at Leiden University. He is a specialist in the theory of condensed matter.

He has a B.S. degree in Physics from the Vrije Universiteit, Amsterdam (1974), a M.S. in Physics from Utrecht University (1976), and a Ph.D. degree in Physics (1976) from the University of Southern California. His thesis advisor was Kazumi Maki.

Career 

His research specialties include the numerical simulation of active proteins and of gene transcription, the self-assembly of viruses, DNA, and chromatin, the electrostatics of DNA and electrical transport along DNA, and adhesion of vesicles and cells.

 Postdoctoral Fellow, Harvard University, 1979-1980.
 Research Associate, Brookhaven National Laboratory, 1980-1982.
 Visiting Scientist, IBM T. J. Watson Research Center, Yorktown, NY, 1982-1984.
 Assistant Professor of Physics, University of California, 1984-1988
 Associate Professor of Physics, University of California, 1988-1990
 Full Professor of Physics, University of California, 1990–present
 Chair, Theoretical Physics for the Life Sciences, Leiden University, 2001–present

Honors

 Pierre et Marie Curie Visiting Professorship (ESPCI) (1994)
 Rothschild Foundation Fellowship (1996)
 Fellow of the American Physical Society (1997)
 Distinguished Lecturer, Collège de France (1999)

References

External links
 Bruinsma's webpage at the UCLA Department of Physics and Astronomy
 
 
 

1953 births
Living people
20th-century Dutch physicists
Scientists from Haarlem
University of Southern California alumni
Harvard Fellows
Fellows of the American Physical Society
21st-century Dutch physicists